The Monument for the 150th Anniversary of the Battle of Puebla is a public park and memorial designed by Enrique Norten of TEN Arquitectos, located in the city of Puebla, Puebla, Mexico. The project was completed during 2011–2012, and commemorates the 150th anniversary of the Battle of Puebla.

References

External links

 

Monuments and memorials in Puebla
Plazas in Mexico
Puebla (city)